Public insurance adjusters help policy holders receive payment from insurance companies.  Public adjusters represent the policyholder for a small percentage of the resulting settlement money from the insurance claim.

What they do

This page on Public Adjusters in incomplete.  Please see:  https://en.wikipedia.org/wiki/Public_adjuster 

Public insurance adjusters represent the policyholder during the insurance claims process. These individuals or companies can inspect property damage, but in general they cannot practice law or give legal advice. While public adjusters are usually not lawyers (while some are), there are exceptions to the applications of laws. In most states where public adjusters are licensed they are issued licensure by a state's insurance commissioner's office to practice insurance; and insurance is based on law and incorporates law, and also operates based on legal principles and protocols. Absent a person have a law license, there are numerous professions that are permitted to practice specific, limited applications of law such as real estate, tax accounting, and insurance. Think of it as lawyers being able to practice any law, while public adjusters are able to practice insurance law, but only in a smaller portion; or to use a different analogy:  if an attorney is a doctor, then a public adjuster is a nurse - both practicing medicine, but the (licensed) nurse is limited by restrictions that are far less than those a (licensed) physician. (The fact is that for most claims, most consumers don’t need more than an assistor like a public adjuster, because adjusting a claim is not complex litigation where an attorney is mandatory).  But, it's still the practice of law -- there is no way to avoid law in insurance, and contrarily law is taught as an integral part of insurance to ensure protections and fairness for society. While a person might be a real estate agent and not a real estate attorney, or a certified public accountant and not a tax attorney, or being an adjuster instead of being either a plaintiff’s counsel or a defense counsel, these non-attorneys who practice these professions actually practice law applications but to a limited degree as authorized by the state. For example, an insurance claims adjuster can execute legal forms for consumers such as sworn statements and releases, and invoke contractual compliances and restrictions. Doing so is actually practicing law, but adjusters are licensed for just such authority. Without such licensure, then such limited legal practices are prohibited, hence the government issued licensure. A license validates the basic competency to practice law-related principles and practices needed to service consumers (be it real estate, accounting, insurance, or other). Adjusters are taught and in many cases that they must master certain legal doctrines in order to do the work of claims processing, adjusting, and advising, in a manner that is fair and protective of the parties involved. This is the practice of law on a restricted basis. This licensure authorizes public adjusters to practice that limited portion of the law that applies to insurance claims and only insurance claims. Any advice exceeding the claim which involves legal interpretation or defining of it would more so escape the restrictions of the licensure and begin to cross into the practice of law.  (However, be advised that many consumers mistake an attorney’s knowledge of insurance to be equal to or greater than a public adjuster, while this is grossly false.  The fact is that for consumer property claims, most attorneys need to seek and obtain the assistance of public adjusters who actually possess superior claims knowledge.  Virtually all attorneys need to hire specialists and/or experts to support their cases, and a public adjuster can be either one or both.  Attorneys are usually not subject matter experts themselves despite many people assuming otherwise).

Public Adjusters cannot provide homeowners with legal advice, but public adjusters can advise homeowners with insurance advice, of questions of the insurance contract, documentation, and engage in regulatory requirements, and effect compliance with state statutes applying to their profession (which is required), while all of these functions include law. If a licensed public adjuster explains to a policyholder/insured that in a particular jurisdiction that the term actual cash value means the current market rate as is defined by the courts in that local, then that is not giving legal advice or engaging in the unauthorized practice of law. In this case, the insurance term is actual cash value, which is also a legal term. To say that actual cash value means market rates is qualifying an insurance concept by interpreting it by the definition in law. In this event, law is being practiced, but is being done within the confinement of an insurance licensure. For an adjuster to advise a policyholder/insured on laws that are not directly related to the concepts of insurance practice or the insurance contract would be more so legal advice than insurance advice. Professionals who are licensed are authorized to practice the rules. For example, to read, interpret, and define an insurance policy, which is an authorized but limited form of legal application.
However, there just a few states which prohibit public adjusters from contract (the policy) interpretation and advisement to policyholders and those insured, because their judicial system has determined that such contract defining for some other person is the practice of law. Contrary to the examples above, which are historically and traditionally practice, there are some jurisdictions where such practices are considered only law, and even licensed persons having expertise cannot engage in contract applications as an insurance policy is in fact a contract. These jurisdictions consider that: 1) contracts can only be interpreted by lawyers, and 2) to represent someone else in a business transaction is the practice of law. Alabama does not license public adjusters at all, because that state considers insurance claims to be all law. However, in most states it is considered that such a limited practice of law, confined to only restricted parameters, is not only the intent of the government to serve the needs of the public without requiring a lawyer (being why public adjusting was created over a hundred years ago), but such subject matter is basis of insurance claims practices.

However, in South Carolina for example, the courts have ruled that for a public adjuster to advise a policyholder/insured on what coverage that policy provides is actually practicing law, and that coverage advice is reserved only for attorneys. This actually makes no sense, defeats the purpose of licensing a person to practice insurance (of which insurance is based on generations of law practice, court rulings, and government regulations), while virtually all other states do not agree with South Carolina's elimination of traditional authority. The fact is that the very reason that public adjusters are adjusters is to practice insurance, which is based on law, includes law, is defined by law, interpreted by law, and according is the very reason for requiring licensure of its practitioners. There is no benefit to the public to avoid the cost and complexity of law practices by attorneys when licensing insurance practitioners for a single function - claims practicing - and then also prohibit any claim practicing (other than estimating costs, which is estimating, not claims practicing). Instead, South Carolina limits public adjusting to only determining values, such as in writing an estimate of the loss and damage. However, not only can any qualified construction contractor prepare such estimates, but being restricted to values determinations alone is the function of appraisal, where appraisers and umpires resolve estimating disagreements - an adjuster is not needed (but in South Carolina, public adjusters can only estimate, cannot represent a consumer, and is relegated to being only a cost advisor to consumers just like any construction contractor would be). Insurance claims appraisals is an alternative dispute resolution method in virtually all policy contracts that is designed to resolve cost disputes without any policy interpretation. Therefore, in effect, when South Carolina relegates only values determinations to the practice of public adjusting, it reduces an insurance claim’s competent professional on the subject matter of coverages, exclusions, and the like to really being just an appraiser or a construction estimator. In such a case, a policyholder/insured would not need a public adjuster, and can just hire a contractor or an appraiser. So, the function of a public adjuster in a state like South Carolina which restricts the practice of public adjusting to that of contractor-estimating or cost-appraising has instead has only nullified the traditional and historical service of public adjusting to serve consumers.

The purpose of licensing persons as claims professionals is to allow them to apply legal concepts that are restricted to a single function, while not allowing any activities greater than those specific regulations. Otherwise, consumers are forced to hire attorneys at triple or greater the cost, and because they practice law and not exclusively insurance, then these attorneys often don't possess the equivalent competency as a public adjuster who has much greater exposure to the volume of claims experiences. Public adjusters also help in building the case that is argued against the insurance company in permissible jurisdictions unlike Alabama or South Carolina.
Adjusters mostly represent clients who have been victim to property damage or loss. Most cases involve disasters including: fires, floods, hurricanes, frost damages, burglaries, and earthquakes.[3]

Licensing
Most American states require public insurance adjusters to be licensed with a professional body before they can practice.

National body
A large collaboration of public insurance adjusters is the National Association of Public Insurance Adjusters, which helps to coordinate claims and make the business environment open to adjusters.

See also
 Public adjuster

References

Public adjusters
Insurance in the United States